Jocotenango (alternate: Xocotenango; translation from Kaqchikel: "place of many plums") is a town and small municipality in the northeast section of Guatemalan department of Sacatepéquez, and is situated north of Antigua Guatemala. It has seven zones, two villages, and one hamlet. According to the 2018 census, the municipality has a total population of 21,657 of which 1,680 are native population and the balance are non-indigenous; and approximately 19,280 live in an urban area, while the balance are rural dwellers.

Jocotenango is the birthplace of multi Grammy Award-winning singer and songwriter Ricardo Arjona.

History

Jocotenango was initially an agricultural field, set up after the Spanish conquest by Adelantado, Pedro de Alvarado, as it was specified in his will, which read: "Called the lords and principals of the town that he had assigned to him, and ask that each one of them give him a certain number of families, and with them he created that settlement; he freed them and donated to them their land; and as the first natives who gathered there were from Utatlán, the town was called Utateca". So was founded the Santiago Utateca settlement.  After the destruction of the old kingdom capital on 11 September 1541, the city was moved to Panchoy valley, and the 
K'achik'eles decided to follow the Spaniards and settled next to Santiago Utateca, founding Jocotenango; eventually both town combined.  In the 1540, bishop Francisco Marroquín split the religious administration of the Guatemalan central valley between the Order of Preachers and the Franciscans, assigned the formet the Jocotenango curato, among others.

After the destruction of Santiago de los Caballeros de Guatemala by the Santa Marta earthquake in 1773, the city moved, this time to La Ermita valley. the old neighborhoods followed suit, among them: Jocotenango, Almolonga, San Pedro, San Gaspas and Nuestra Señora de Guatemala.  Thus, there was a second Jocotenango settlement next to the new Guatemala City, which was eventually swallowed by the metropolis and is part of the modern Zone 2.

The old Jocotenango, previously considered a suburb, received municipality status in the middle of the 19th century.

Geography
Hydrographic features include the  Rio Guacalate, streams, and a creek. Jocotenango is located in a mountainous rain forest in a sub-tropical region. According to the 2003 Ministerio de Agricultura (English:Secretary of Agriculture) report, approximately 93 hectares are used for agriculture, while 75 hectares are in forest. Deposits of Placedrín Andesite have been found here.

Vulnerability to natural disaster is evidenced by severe erosion to the Rio Guacalate basin, forest fires, accelerated deforestation, and floods.  Slope sediment, along with poor soil management, is most visible in the villages of La Rinconada and Vista Hermosa. An annual threat to the populated areas is flooding during periods of rainfall.  It requires the municipality to clear hundreds of cubic meters of sediment that accumulates in the streets.  This type of erosion causes loss of productive soil capacity, exposure of basement rock, and generation of landslides and mudslides.

The average rainfall is 1344 mm/year while the temperature varies between 16 and 23 °C.

Flora and fauna
The forest coverage rate is important for town's socioeconomics. Most of the wooded area, is located on the hill Panza de Burro and near the municipal yard. Flora includes species of oak, cypress, and palo de jiote (Bursera simaruba).

The fauna is associated with crops that predominate the area such as agouti, coyote, mouse opossum, rabbit, squirrels, white-tailed deer, and gophers. Birds include, hummingbird,  quail, hawk, and dove.

Culture
The red brick Jocotenango Church lies in the town.

La Azotea ("roof") Cultural Center features, built on an ancient coffee estate, has three museums.  Casa K’ojom ("House of K'ojom"), a music museum, features traditional Maya musical instruments such as diatomic harp, drums, flutes, marimbas, ocarinas, and whistles.  Masks, paintings, traditional costumes and crafts are also exhibited. The Museo del Café ("Museum of Coffee") is dedicated to the history and evolution of coffee cultivation. Coffee beans are displayed in varying stages of production, antique equipment can be viewed, and as it is situated at an actual plantation, on-site tours are available. There is also a small costume museum.

Its main festival is celebrated each year during the week of August 8.

Transportation

Buses bound from Antigua's bus terminal to Chimaltenango stop at Jocotenango.

Climate

Jocotenango has a subtropical highland climate (Köppen climate classification: Cwb).

Geographic location

Jocotenango is surrounded by Sacatepéquez Department municipalities.

See also

Notes and references

References

Bibliography

External links

Casa K'Ojom, Museo de Musica Maya (in Spanish)

Municipalities of the Sacatepéquez Department